Hroznatín is a municipality and village in Třebíč District in the Vysočina Region of the Czech Republic. It has about 100 inhabitants.

Notable people
Ludvík Svoboda (1895–1979), general, President of Czechoslovakia in 1968–1975

References

External links

Villages in Třebíč District